Shingo Kunieda and Satoshi Saida defeated the two-time defending champions Robin Ammerlaan and Michaël Jeremiasz in the final, 6–3, 6–2 to win the men's doubles wheelchair tennis title at the 2007 US Open.

Seeds

 Shingo Kunieda /  Satoshi Saida (champions)
 Robin Ammerlaan/  Michaël Jeremiasz (finals)

Doubles

Finals

External links
Draw
PDF Draw

Wheelchair Men's Doubles
U.S. Open, 2007 Men's Doubles